John Andrews is an American politician serving as a Representative in the Maine House of Representatives since 2018. He was first elected as a Republican to the 73rd district, but became a Libertarian in 2020 due to his dissatisfaction with the house committee assignments given to him. Andrews rejoined the Republican Party in 2022. Due to redistricting, he ran as a Republican in 2022 for Maine House district 79 and was re-elected.

Maine House of Representatives 
Elected in 2018 as a Republican, he switched to the Libertarian Party shortly after being re-elected in 2020—becoming the first Libertarian to serve in either chamber of the Maine Legislature—due to dissatisfaction with the committee assignments given to him by his floor leader. Andrews rejoined the Republicans in 2022, citing the removal of the Libertarian Party of Maine as an officially recognized party in the state.

Personal life 
Andrews lives in Paris, Maine with his wife, Jeannette Andrews, and his two children. In 2001 he graduated with a B.A. from the University of New Hampshire.

Electoral history

References

External links 

Year of birth missing (living people)
Living people
Republican Party members of the Maine House of Representatives
Libertarian Party (United States) officeholders
21st-century American politicians